Carlingford was an electoral district of the Legislative Assembly in the Australian State of New South Wales from 1988 to 1991, named after the suburb of Carlingford.  In 1999, it was replaced by Baulkham Hills.  Its only member was Wayne Merton, representing the Liberal Party.

Members for Carlingford

Election results

1988

References

Carlingford
Carlingford
1988 establishments in Australia
Carlingford
1991 disestablishments in Australia